This is a list of singles that charted in the top ten of the ARIA Charts in 2012.

Top-ten singles

Key

1992 peaks

2011 peaks

2013 peaks

Entries by artist
The following table shows artists who achieved two or more top 10 entries in 2012, including songs that reached their peak in 2011 and 2013. The figures include both main artists and featured artists. The total number of weeks an artist spent in the top ten in 2012 is also shown.

See also
2012 in music
ARIA Charts
List of number-one singles of 2012 (Australia)
List of top 25 singles for 2012 in Australia

References

2012 in Australian music
Top 10 singles 2012
Australia Top 10